Anastasia Andreevna Popova (November 24, 1987, Moscow) is a Russian journalist who works for Russia-24. She directed a documentary The Syrian Diary about the war in Syria.

She was one of the eight flag bearers of the Olympic flag at the opening ceremony of the 2014 Winter Olympics.

References

Russian journalists
Living people
1987 births
21st-century Russian journalists
Russian women journalists